The Bugatti EB 218 saloon is the second concept car presented by Bugatti under the ownership of the Volkswagen Auto Group. The EB 218 was designed by Giorgetto Giugiaro, who also designed the EB 112, the car's predecessor and the EB 118, the car's 2-door variant. The EB 218 can be considered as an update of the EB 112, a concept saloon introduced by Bugatti Automobili SpA in 1993. The EB 218 features Volkswagen's unconventional W18 engine and permanent four-wheel drive borrowed from the Lamborghini Diablo VT.

Design

Bugatti commissioned Giorgetto Giugiaro of Italdesign to update the EB 112 concept that he designed for Bugatti Automobili SpA in 1993. The most notable visual differences between the EB 218 and the EB 112 is a redesigned hood, bumpers and lights. The overall design is far less controversial than the EB 112's "Droopy hatchback-saloon" design and has a much more of a typical saloon shape rather than the EB 112's hatchback shape. The interior design is very simple yet extremely luxurious, with beige leather seats and a large wooden dashboard which manages to keep all the instruments and vents "composed". The EB 218 draws inspiration from the classic Type 101 Guillore.

Debut
Bugatti introduced the EB 218 at the 1999 Geneva Motor Show, one year after its 2-door counterpart was introduced at the 1998 Paris Auto Show.

Powertrain
The EB 218 uses the same W18 engine and permanent four wheel drive powertrain that debuted in the 1998 EB 118. The same technology was used in the 1999 18/3 Chiron concept car.

This engine design was extremely unconventional due to the unusual firing order of the engine. The EB 218 W18 engine is composed of three banks of six cylinders with a sixty degree offset between each cylinder bank. In contrast, the W16 engine in Bugatti's (Under Volkswagen ownership) first production car, the 2005 Veyron EB 16.4 features four banks of four cylinders. The EB 218 has the permanent all-wheel drive taken from the Lamborghini Diablo VT sports car.

References

External links

Motor1.com. Bugatti ID 90 And EB 112, EB 118, EB 218: Concept We Forgot

All-wheel-drive vehicles
Retro-style automobiles
1990s cars
Bugatti concept vehicles